Staggers may refer to:

People
 Staggers (surname)

Other uses
 Grass staggers, a metabolic disorder of cattle and sheep, caused by magnesium deficiency
 Transport tetany in livestock
 The Staggers Rail Act (1980) in the USA
 Slang for decompression sickness
 The New Statesman, a British political journal nicknamed "The Staggers"
 St Stephen's House, Oxford, an Anglican theological college nicknamed "Staggers"

See also
Stagger (disambiguation)